KLUH is a Christian radio station licensed to Poplar Bluff, Missouri, broadcasting on 90.3 MHz FM.  The station's format consists of Christian contemporary music along with some Christian talk and teaching.  The station is owned by David Craig Ministries, Inc.

References

External links
KLUH's official website

LUH
Radio stations established in 1988
1988 establishments in Missouri